Susiana (Old Persian: Zâzâna) or Zazana, Zazannu was an ancient Mesopotamian city or town located by the Euphrates river.

References

Populated places on the Euphrates River